In feminist theory, the male gaze is the act of depicting women and the world in the visual arts and in literature from a masculine, heterosexual perspective that presents and represents women as sexual objects for the pleasure of the heterosexual male viewer. In the visual and aesthetic presentations of narrative cinema, the male gaze has three perspectives: (i) that of the man behind the camera, (ii) that of the male characters within the film's cinematic representations; and (iii) that of the spectator gazing at the image.

The gaze was a concept developed in 20th-century French philosophy. The term "male gaze" was first used by the English art critic John Berger in Ways of Seeing, a series of films for the BBC aired in January 1972, and later a book, as part of his analysis of the treatment of women as objects in advertising and nudes in European painting. It soon became popular among feminists, including the British film critic Laura Mulvey, who used it to critique traditional media representations of the female character in cinema and coined the phrase.

The psychoanalytic theories of Sigmund Freud and Jacques Lacan are foundational in Mulvey's development of a male gaze theory, as they provide a lens through which Mulvey was able to interpret the "primordial wish for pleasurable looking" satisfied through the cinematic experience. As a way of seeing women and the world, psychoanalytic theorizations of the male gaze involve Freudian and Lacanian concepts such as scopophilia or the pleasure of looking. The terms scopophilia and scoptophilia identify both the aesthetic joy and the sexual pleasures derived from looking at someone or something.

The male gaze is conceptually contrasted with the female gaze.

Background 

The existentialist philosopher Jean-Paul Sartre introduced the concept of le regard, the gaze, in Being and Nothingness (1943), wherein the act of gazing at another human being creates a subjective power difference, which is felt by the gazer and by the gazed because the person being gazed at is perceived as an object, not as a human being. The cinematic concept of the male gaze is presented, explained, and developed in the essay "Visual Pleasure and Narrative Cinema" (1975), in which Laura Mulvey proposes that sexual inequality — the asymmetry of social and political power between men and women — is a controlling social force in the cinematic representations of women and men. The male gaze (the aesthetic pleasure of the male viewer) is a social construct derived from the ideologies and discourses of patriarchy. In the fields of media studies and feminist film theory, the male gaze is conceptually related to the behaviors of voyeurism (looking as sexual pleasure), scopophilia (pleasure from looking), and narcissism (pleasure from contemplating one's self).

Another critical part of Mulvey's theory is built upon a Freudian psychoanalytic concept of male castration anxiety. Because the woman lacks phallus, her presence evokes unpleasantness in the male unconsciousness. To mitigate this unpleasantness, Mulvey theorizes that women are transformed into passive recipients of male objectification in media representations. The mere presence of a female body on screen, "her lack of penis, [implies] a threat of castration and hence unpleasure," which is subverted through the over-sexualization of her femininity. For Mulvey, there are two ways in which women, as the passive recipients of the male gaze, can be sexualized to avert castration fear: voyeurism-sadism and fetishization. In Mulvey's analysis, voyeurism-sadism references that “pleasure lies in ascertaining guilt (immediately associated with castration), asserting control and subjecting the guilty person through punishment or forgiveness,” which is noted by Mulvey to align more with a narrative cinematic structure than does scopophilia fetishization. Fetishistic scopophilia reduces the threat of castration fear associated with the female presence by fragmenting and hypersexualizing parts of the female body.

In a narrative film, the visual perspective of the male gaze is the sight line of the camera as the spectator's perspective — that of a heterosexual man whose sight lingers upon the features of a woman's body. In narrative cinema, the male gaze usually displays the female character (woman, girl, child) on two levels of eroticism: (i) as an erotic object of desire for the characters in the filmed story; and (ii) as an erotic object of desire for the male viewer (spectator) of the filmed story. Such visualizations establish the roles of the dominant male and dominated female, by representing the female as a passive object for the male gaze of the active viewer. The social pairing of the passive object (woman) and the active viewer (man) is a functional basis of patriarchy, i.e., gender roles that are culturally reinforced in and by the aesthetics (textual, visual, symbolic) of the mainstream, commercial cinema; the movies of which feature the male gaze as more important than the female gaze, an aesthetic choice based upon the inequality of socio-political power between men and women.

As an ideological basis of patriarchy, socio-political inequality is realized as a value system by which male-created institutions (e.g. the movie business, advertising, fashion) unilaterally determine what is "natural and normal" in society. In time, the people of a community believe that the artificial values of patriarchy, as a social system, are the "natural and normal" order of things in society because men look at women and women are looked at by men. The Western hierarchy of "inferior women" and "superior men" derives from misrepresenting men and women as sexual opponents, rather than as sexual equals.

Gazing at the nude woman

In the television series and book Ways of Seeing (1972), where the term was first used, the art critic John Berger addressed the sexual objectification of women in the arts and advertising by emphasizing that men look and women are looked at as the subjects of images. For art-as-spectacle, men act, and women are acted-upon according to the social conditions of spectatorship, which are determined by the artistic and aesthetic conventions of objectification, which artists have not transcended.

In the genre of the Renaissance nude, the woman who is the subject of the image often is aware of being looked at, either by others in the painting or by the spectator who is gazing at the painting in which she is the subject. Berger analyzes two of Tintoretto's paintings of Susanna and the Elders, a story of a woman falsely accused of adultery after two men discover one another spying on her while she bathes. In the first, she "looks back at us looking at her." In the second, she is looking at herself in a mirror and thus joining the elders and us as a spectator of herself. Susanna's lack of distress and even nonchalance at being observed naked in both paintings and others by male artists have been contrasted to the apparent pain shown in the depiction of the same scene by Artemisia Gentileschi, a female artist, whose Susanna shows she is clearly in distress at being watched by the two men.

In the production of art, the conventions of artistic representation connect the objectification of a woman, by the male gaze, to the Lacanian theory of social alienation. The psychological splitting that occurs from seeing oneself as one is and seeing one's self as an idealized representation. In Italian Renaissance painting, especially in the nude-woman genre, that perceptual split arises from being both the viewer and the viewed and from seeing one's self through  other people's gaze.

Effects of the male gaze
Research by Calogero has shown that the male gaze can affect women's self-esteem and self-objectification, leading to increased body shame and a worsened mental state. For most women, it is not a physical interaction with a man which causes such internalized feelings of self-objectification and negative mental states but is simply anticipating being the subject of the male gaze. It is not only a worsened mental state and self-objectification, which is a potential effect of the male gaze, but also feelings of anxiety about physiques and body shape. 

According to Snow's research, male gaze has gradually evolved into a patriarchal theory, despite being an abstract idea, the masculine gaze has actual psychological impacts. Women experience real impacts from being asked to perform for others all the time. In comparison to individuals who anticipated a female look or no gaze at all, the mere anticipation of a male gaze increased self-objectification in young women and resulted in greater body shame and social physique anxiety. Because the male gaze is prevalent, women have been implicitly taught how to behave in its presence. Never slouch or curse, wear nice clothes in case you run into someone, and present yourself the way people want. Women are held to these standards, and if they somehow fail to meet them, they are at blame.

Concepts

Scopophilia
Two forms of the male gaze are based on the Freudian concept of scopophilia. This "pleasure that is linked to sexual attraction (voyeurism in the extreme) and [the] scopophilic pleasure that is linked to narcissistic identification (the introjection of ideal egos)," shows how women have been forced to view the cinema from the perspectives (sexual, aesthetic, cultural) of the male gaze. In such cinematic representations, the male gaze denies the female's agency and human identity, thus dehumanizing a woman, transforming her from person to object, to be considered only for her beauty, physique, and sex appeal, as defined in the male sexual fantasy of narrative cinema.

Spectatorship
Two types of spectatorship occur while viewing a film, wherein the viewer either unconsciously or consciously engages in the typical, ascribed societal roles of men and women. Concerning phallocentrism, a film can be viewed from the perspectives of "three different looks": (i) the first look is that of the camera, which records the events of the film; (ii) the second look describes the nearly voyeuristic act of the audience as they view the film proper; and (iii) the third look is that of the characters who interact with one another throughout the filmed story. The perspective common to the three types of looks is the idea that looking generally is perceived as the active role of the male while being looked at generally is perceived as the passive role of the female. Therefore, based upon that patriarchal construction, the cinema presents and represents women as objects of desire, wherein women characters have an "appearance coded for strong visual and erotic impact"; therefore, the actress is never meant to represent a strong female character whose actions directly affect the outcome of the plot or propel the events of the filmed story, but, instead, she is in the film to visually support the actor, portraying the male protagonist, by "bearing the burden of sexual objectification," a condition psychologically unbearable for the male actor.

A woman being the passive object of the male gaze is the link to scopophilia, to the aesthetic pleasure derived from looking at someone as an object of beauty. As an expression of sexuality, scopophilia refers to the pleasure (sensual and sexual) derived from looking at sexual fetishes and photographs, pornography and naked bodies, etc. There are two categories of pleasurable viewing: (i) voyeurism, wherein the viewer's pleasure is in looking at another person from a distance, and he or she projects fantasies, usually sexual, onto the gazed upon person; and (ii) narcissism, wherein the viewer's pleasure is in self-recognition when viewing the image of another person. These concepts of voyeurism and narcissism translate to psychoanalytic concepts of object libido and ego libido, respectively. Mulvey theorizes that in order for women to enjoy cinema, they must learn to identify with the male protagonist and assume his perspective, the male gaze.

The female gaze
 The female gaze is conceptually similar to the male gaze; that is, when women take up the male gaze, they view other people, and themselves, from the perspective of a man. The male gaze is a manifestation of unequal social power, between the gazing man and the gazed-upon woman; and also is a conscious or subconscious social effort to develop gender inequality in service to a patriarchal sexual order. From either perspective, a woman who welcomes the sexual objectification of the male gaze might be perceived as conforming to social norms established for the benefit of men, thereby reinforcing the objectifying power of the male gaze upon women; or, she might be perceived as an exhibitionist woman taking social advantage of the sexual objectification inherent to the male gaze, in order to manipulate the sexist norms of the patriarchy to her personal benefit.

It is not simply the fact that women are eroticized and objectified because this is a phenomenon that seems to be a component of both male and female eroticism in western culture. Kaplan argues that it is the fact that “men do not simply look; their gaze carries with it the power of action and of possession which is lacking in the female gaze. Women receive and return a gaze, but cannot act upon it” and “the sexualization and objectification of women is not simply for the purposes of eroticism; from a psychoanalytic point of view, it is designed to annihilate the threat that women pose”. Kaplan emphasizes that while the gazes are similar, the female gaze is not able to possess the same power as that of the male gaze. The male gaze will always undermine the women’s position and demean her very presence into a position of subjectivity and submission.

Criticism

Rejection
The theory is not without criticism as feminist academic Camille Paglia has rejected the concept of the cinematic male gaze: From the moment feminism began to solidify its ideology in the early '70s,
Hitchcock became a whipping boy for feminist theory. I've been very vocal about my opposition to the simplistic theory of "the male gaze" that is associated with Laura Mulvey (and that she herself has moved somewhat away from) and that has taken over feminist film studies to a vampiric degree in the last 25 years. The idea that a man looking at or a director filming a beautiful woman makes her an object, makes her passive beneath the male gaze which seeks control over woman by turning her into mere matter, into "meat" -- I think this was utter nonsense from the start. It was formulated by people who knew nothing about the history of painting or sculpture, the history of the fine arts. It was an a priori theory: First there was feminist ideology, asserting that history is nothing but male oppression and female victimization, and then came this theory -- the "victim" model of feminism applied wholesale to works of culture.

Matrixial gaze
Bracha Ettinger criticized the male gaze with the matrixial gaze, which is inoperative when the male gaze is opposite to the female gaze, wherein both perspectives constitute each other from a lack, which is the Lacanian definition of "The Gaze". The matrixial gaze does not concern a subject and its object existing or lacking, but concerns "trans-subjectivity" and shareability, and is based upon the feminine-matrixial-difference, which escapes the phallic opposition of masculine–feminine, and is produced by co-emergence. Parting from Lacan's latter work, Ettinger's perspective is about the structure of the Lacanian subject, itself, which is deconstructed, and thus produces a perspective of feminine dimension with a hybrid, floating matrixial gaze.

E. Anne Kaplan's theorizing also suggests that the male gaze constructs a falsely hypersexualized feminine in order to dismiss the sensual feminine which all people are connected to through their innate relationship to a maternal figure. Kaplan states that "the domination of women by the male gaze is part of men's strategy to contain the threat that the mother embodies, and to control the positive and negative impulses that memory traces of being mothered have left in the male unconsciousness," though she also theorizes that the mutual gaze which neither seeks subordination or domination of the looker or the looked-at originates in the mother-child relationship. She also discusses hows “our culture is deeply committed to myths of demarcated sex differences, called 'masculine' and 'feminine, which in turn revolve first on a complex gaze apparatus and second on dominance-submission patterns.  This positioning of the two sex genders in representation clearly privileges the male (through the mechanisms of voyeurism and fetishism, which are male operations, and because his desire carries power/action where woman’s usually does not)”. This is why the matrixial gaze functions the way it does, because feminine and masculine expressions are constantly in juxtaposition.

The female gaze
The cultural analyst Griselda Pollock said that the female gaze can be visually negated; using the example of Robert Doisneau's photograph Sidelong Glance (1948) Pollock describes a bourgeois, middle-aged couple viewing artworks in the display window of an art gallery. In the photograph, the spectator's perspective is from inside the art gallery. The couple is looking in a different direction than that of the spectator. The woman is speaking to her husband about a painting at which she is gazing, whilst her distracted husband is gazing at a painting of a nude woman, which also is in view of the spectator. The woman is looking at another artwork, which is not in view of the spectator. The man's gaze has found someone more interesting to gaze at, thus ignoring his wife's comment. Pollock's analysis of the Sidelong Glance photograph is that: "She [the wife] is contrasted, iconographically, to the naked woman. She is denied the picturing of her desire; what she looks at is blank for the spectator. She is denied being the object of desire, because she is represented as a woman who actively looks, rather than [as a woman passively] returning and confirming the gaze of the masculine spectator."

In "Watching the Detectives: The Enigma of the Female Gaze" (1989), Lorraine Gamman said that the female gaze is distinguished from the male gaze through its displacement of the power of scopophilia, which  creates the possibility of multiple viewing angles, because "the female gaze cohabits the space occupied by men, rather than being entirely divorced from it"; therefore, the female gaze does not appropriate the "voyeurism" of the male gaze, because its purpose is to disrupt the phallocentric power of the male gaze, by providing other modes of looking at someone.

Mary Anne Doane's 1982 essay "Film and the Masquerade: Theorising the Female Spectator" continues an analysis of the male gaze in feminist film theory, highlighting how psychoanalytic theory, specifically Freud's, discounted the importance of the female spectator because “too close to herself, entangled in her own enigma, she could not step back, could not achieve the necessary distance of a second look”. Doane also deepened the understanding of the voyeuristic or fetishistic gazes to imply a "pleasurable transgression" of looking which greatly depends on the spatial proximity of the spectator to the spectated. In intentionally creating space between the subject (spectator) and the object (screen), the male gaze perpetuates an "infinite pursuit of an absent object". Such distanced spatial proximity is denied to the female spectator on the account that there is a "masochism of over-identification or the narcissism entailed in becoming one's own object of desire," which is the opposite of what Mulvey proposed had prevented men from being objectified by the cinematic gaze. Doane concludes that female spectators are afforded two options, or what she called a "transvestite metaphor": to identify with the passive positions female characters are subject to in cinematic male gaze representation, or to identify with the masochistic position of the male gaze as a sort of defiance to the patriarchal assumptions which define femininity as a closeness.

In "Networks of Remediation" (1999), Jay David Bolter and Richard Grusin said that Mulvey's male gaze coincides with "the desire for visual immediacy" — the erasure of the visual medium for uninhibited interaction with the person portrayed — which is identified in feminist film theory as the "male desire that takes an overt sexual meaning when the object of representation, and therefore desire, is a woman." Bolter and Grusin proposed the term hypermediacy — drawing the spectator's attention to the medium (or media) and to the process of mediation present in an artwork — to be a form of the female gaze, because it "is multiple and deviant in its suggestion of multiplicity — a multiplicity of viewing positions, and a multiplicity of relationships, to the object in view, including sexual objects"; thus, like the female gaze, hypermediacy disrupts the myopic and monolithic male gaze, by offering more angles of viewing.

Photographer Farhat Basir Khan said that the female gaze is inherent to photographs taken by a woman, which perspective negates the stereotypical male-gaze perspective inherent to "male-constructed" photographs, which, in the history of art, have presented and represented women as objects, rather than as persons. The female gaze was the subject of the Feminigraphy exhibition, curated by Khan, at the Indira Gandhi National Centre for the Arts in January 2017.

As a part of the feminization of the male gaze, many scholars refer to what is known as the Medusa theory, or the idea that women who take up the female gaze are characterized as dangerous monsters, for men both desire and fear a gaze that objectifies them in the way a male gaze reduces a woman to a mere object. Scholar Susan Bower's 1990 piece "Medusa and the Female Gaze" more deeply examines this phenomenon, which begins when the woman who sees that she is being seen (by the male gaze) deconstructs and rejects her own objectification. A crucial aspect of the male gaze appears to be its subdued, unquestioned existence, which the female gaze disrupts as women acknowledge themselves as the object and refuse to accept this position by returning an equally objectifying gaze. Bowers uses the example of George Grosz's illustration Sex Murder on Ackerstrasse (Lustmord in der Ackerstrasse) to demonstrate how "without a head, the woman in the drawing can threaten neither the man with her nor the male spectator with her own subjectivity. Her mutilated body is a symbol of how men have been able to deal with women by relegating them to visual objectivity". As such, just as in Greek mythology, it requires the violent dismemberment of women's heads - symbolizing their capacity to return an equally objectifying gaze to the male character - in order to subjugate the female gaze to acceptable heteropatriarchal norms.

Oppositional gaze 

In the essay "The Oppositional Gaze: Black Female Spectators" (1997) bell hooks argues that Black women are placed outside the "pleasure in looking" by being excluded as subjects of the male gaze. Beyond the exclusivity of sex/sexuality as signifiers of difference, bell hooks addresses through oppositional gaze theory how the power in looking is also defined along lines of race. From her interpretation of Mulvey's essay "Visual Pleasure and Narrative Cinema" (1975), hooks said that "from a standpoint that acknowledges race, one sees clearly why Black women spectators, not duped by mainstream cinema, would develop an oppositional gaze" to the male gaze. In relation to Lacan's mirror stage, during which a child develops the capacity for self-recognition, and thus the ideal ego, the oppositional gaze functions as a form of looking back, in search of the Black female body within the cinematic idealization of white womanhood.

As hooks states, the black female spectator identifies "with neither the phallocentric gaze nor the construction of white womanhood as lack," and thus, "critical black female spectators construct a theory of looking relations where cinematic visual delight is the pleasure of interrogation". This pleasure of interrogation stems from a reaction to cinematic representation which "denies the 'body' of the black female so as to perpetuate white supremacy and with it a phallocentric spectatorship where the woman to be looked at and desired is white". Through a perspective that accounts for signifiers of difference that lie outside the exclusivity of previously perpetuated lines of sex/sexuality, hooks is able to curate an entirely organic pleasure in looking, not associated with the scopophilia Mulvey originally outlined.

In the context of feminist theory, the absence of discussion of racial relations, within the "totalizing category [of] Women", is a process of denial that refutes the reality that the criticism of many feminist film critics concerns only the cinematic presentation and representation of white women. In the course of being interviewed by hooks, a working-class Black woman said that "to see black women in the position [that] white women have occupied in film forever . . .", is to see a transfer without transformation; therefore, the oppositional gaze encompasses intellectual resistance, and understanding and awareness of the politics of race and of racism via cinematic whiteness, inclusive of the male gaze.

The oppositional gaze has been the subject of feminist artist like Carrie Mae Weems, who explores the relationship between audience and object through a racialized scope.

Queering the gaze 
Much theorization of the male gaze has remained inside the heteropatriarchal paradigm concerning only sexual relationships between men and women, but scholars like Karen Hollinger have extended gaze theory to include queer cinematic representation, such as the conceptualization of a lesbian gaze. Hollinger conceptualizes the lesbian gaze as a mutual gaze extended between two women, making neither and both the object and subject of a gaze. The absence of a heterosexual male presence to enable a controlling male gaze within the lesbian film genre begins to dismantle the patriarchal hegemony perpetuated by the male gaze. The female gaze is also further developed in lesbian gaze theory, where cinematic lesbians are "simultaneously both subject and object of the look and consequently of female desire". This is especially evident in what Hollinger references as "ambiguous lesbian cinema," where "the sexual orientation of its female characters is never made explicit, and viewers are left to read the text largely as they wish," preventing the fetishization of the lesbian identity by heterosexual male viewers by blurring the line between plutonic and platonic relationships between women.

Another scholar, Danielle Lefebvre, suggests that there is a degree of affirmation found in the everyday manifestation of the male gaze for trans women. Lefebvre states that "when the male gaze is affirming and one’s identity is validated, it may be a motivator to continue to conform to consistently be correctly gendered and avoid harm for not conforming". Manifestations of the male gaze can be affirming for trans women whose gender performance of femininity gains acceptance when it is subjected to the objectified position of the feminine by a male audience. While Lefebvre points out the ways in which trans women can benefit from the male gaze, she also discusses the negative effects that it can have on cis men. She argues that when cis men exhibit feminine traits they often face backlash, including sexual harassment from their communities. “The goal of sexual harassment is to enforce traditional masculinity and ‘punish’ men who do not conform to these norms”. While these gender norms can benefit trans women they harm cis men due to the cultural basis that men are dominant and masculine while women are submissive and feminine. It is this notion that exacerbates the male gaze. 

Some scholars have also hypothesized that cinematic male gaze acts as a "safety valve for homoerotic tensions," where these sexual tensions are projected onto female characters as a negation of male homoeroticism in popular genres like action movies or buddy comedies. One of these scholars, Patrick Shuckmann, finds that homoerotic gaze theory reframes female objectification in male character's relationship to female characters' existence as an Other, an alternative upon which the homoeroticism can be redirected away from male character relationships. In other words, women in film are not just objects of desire, they are objects of displaced desire. To demonstrate that the purpose of women on the screen is to validate heterosexuality, in a context where it is otherwise subverted by homoerotic images, Shuckmann introduces three plot contexts where the male gaze is crucial in de-eroticizing male character relationships on screen. The first, is an action plot where two men are engaged in close-combat where the homoerotic close-physical contact is repressed through violence and the male gaze objectifying women becomes a "safety valve" for homoerotic conflict. The second plot describes the buddy movie genre, where homoerotic tension is entirely acknowledged in alluded jokes, but denied through a male-gaze objectification of the heterosexual male-female relationship either male character may possess. Lastly, there is the good versus evil plot genre, where two men share an obsessive, borderline homoerotic, fixation with one another as they repeatedly seek each other out. This genre is usually complemented by a marginal female character who serves no other plot purpose besides to affirm heterosexuality. The movie Point Break is an example of the third plot genre, and provides context for the analysis of the male gaze as a tool for subverting repressed male homoeroticism on screen.

See also 
Gaze
Imperial gaze
Screen theory
White gaze

References
 39. Wan Yahya, Wan Roselezam, et al. “Male Gaze, Pornography and the Fetishised Female.” The International Journal of Interdisciplinary Social Sciences: Annual Review, vol. 5, no. 1, 2010, pp. 25–38., doi:10.18848/1833-1882/cgp/v05i01/53015.

Further reading
 

Feminist terminology
Feminist theory
Feminism and the arts
Film theory